Hương Lâm  is a commune (xã) and village in Hiệp Hòa District, Bắc Giang Province, in northeastern Vietnam. Huong Lam commune has an area of 12.81 km², and in 1999 had a population of 11,955 people.

References

Populated places in Bắc Giang province
Communes of Bắc Giang province